Venezuela sent a delegation to compete at the 2008 Summer Paralympics in Beijing.

Medalists

Sports

Athletics

Men's track

Men's field

Women's track

Cycling

Men's road

Men's track

Judo

Men

Women

Powerlifting

Swimming

Men

Women

Table tennis

See also
Venezuela at the Paralympics
Venezuela at the 2008 Summer Olympics

Nations at the 2008 Summer Paralympics
2008
Paralympics